Garretson is a surname and patronymic name meaning "son of Garret". Notable people with the surname include:

 Austin B. Garretson (1856–1931), an American labor leader who became president of the Order of Railway Conductors.
 Bob Garretson (born 1933), American racing driver
 Darell Garretson (1932–2008), American basketball referee
 John Wesley Garretson (1812-1895), a surveyor who mapped large areas of Askansas and New Mexico
 Katy Garretson, American television director
Mary Welleck Garretson (1896-1971), American geologist and paleontologist
 Ron Garretson (born 1958), American professional basketball referee
 A. S. Garretson  Founder of Garretson, South Dakota and Corona, California